Jan Õun (born 8 February 1977) is a retired football (soccer) forward from Estonia. He played for several clubs in his native country, including JK Viljandi Tulevik and FC Kuressaare.

International career
Õun earned his first official cap for the Estonia national football team on 19 May 1995, when Estonia played Latvia at the Baltic Cup 1995. He obtained a total number of four caps for his native country.

References

1977 births
Living people
Estonian footballers
Estonia international footballers
Association football forwards
Viljandi JK Tulevik players
FC Kuressaare players